is a Japanese vegetable drink most commonly made from kale or young barley grass.  The drink is also known as green drink or green juice in English, a direct translation of the Japanese meaning. Even though ao means "blue" in modern Japanese, it is still sometimes used to refer to green vegetation in older contexts.

He credited the cure of his son from pneumonia and of his wife from nephritis to aojiru, and in 1949 concluded that kale was the best ingredient for his juice.

Today, many Japanese companies manufacture aojiru, usually using kale, young barley or komatsuna leaves as the base of the drink, and the size of the aojiru market was well over $500 million in 2005.

The taste of aojiru is famously unpleasant, so much so that drinking a glass of the liquid is a common punishment on Japanese TV game shows. However, new formulations of aojiru have attempted to minimize the bitter taste of the original.

In 1990, actor and former baseball player Nobuo Yana was hired by Q'SAI as a testimonial for the drink, and his own impressions of it resulted in the commercial's famous tagline "Horrible! I'll have another one.".

Aojiru is a rich source of certain vitamins and minerals, and care should therefore be taken when undergoing certain treatments or if on certain medication. The high levels of potassium, phosphorus, and vitamin A are said to worsen the health of patients on dialysis, while the high levels of vitamin K could decrease the effectiveness of medication taken for circulatory problems.

See also
 Health food
 Ao (color)

External links 

 Make green drinks and smoothies with blenders

References

Japanese drinks
Juice